Since the 2007 municipal reform, only parties of the blue bloc had held the mayor's position in Greve Municipality. Current mayor coming into this election was Pernille Beckmann from Venstre, who had been mayor following the 2013 election and the 2017 election
. In the 2017 election, the blue bloc had won 13 of the 21 seats.

In this election, no dramatic changes occurred. The Social Democrats, Liberal Alliance and Danish People's Party would all lose a seat. The Conservatives gained 1 seat, but did not come anywhere near the 9 seats Venstre won, despite having held the mayor's position before in the municipality. The New Right would win representation with 1 seat for the first time in the party's history, while the Green Left would win representation with 1 seat, for the first time since the 2009 election. Again the blue bloc had won 13 seats, and Pernille Beckmann looked likely to continue for a third term. This would later be confirmed.

Electoral system
For elections to Danish municipalities, a number varying from 9 to 31 are chosen to be elected to the municipal council. The seats are then allocated using the D'Hondt method and a closed list proportional representation.
Greve Municipality had 21 seats in 2021

Unlike in Danish General Elections, in elections to municipal councils, electoral alliances are allowed.

Electoral alliances  

Electoral Alliance 1

Electoral Alliance 2

Electoral Alliance 3

Results

Notes

References 

Greve